The following list includes notable people who were born or have lived in Hallowell, Maine.

Academics and writing 

 Gorham Dummer Abbott, clergyman, educator and author
 Jacob Abbott, children's writer
 Martha Ballard, colonial midwife; her diary inspired the Pulitzer Prize–winning novel A Midwife's Tale: The Life of Martha Ballard, Based on Her Diary, 1785–1812 
 George Baron, mathematician
 Elias Bond, missionary and teacher
 William H. Getchell, 19th-century photographer
 Hall J. Kelley, settler and writer
 Emma Huntington Nason (1845–1921), poet, author, and musical composer
 Howard Parshley, zoologist
 Thomas Sewall, doctor, writer and professor

Business and finance 

 Thomas Hamlin Hubbard, general, lawyer, philanthropist and financier
 William Ladd, Ladd & Company founder
 Samuel Vaughan Merrick, manufacturer
 Thelma C. Swain, philanthropist
 Benjamin Vaughan, political economist, merchant and doctor

Entertainment 

 Abbott Vaughn Meader, political humorist

Military 

 Amos Stoddard, US Army officer (American Revolutionary War and the War of 1812)

Music 

 Supply Belcher, composer, singer, and compiler of tune books

Politics and law 

 Hiram Belcher, US congressman
 Joseph R. Bodwell, 40th governor of Maine
 Scott Cowger, state legislator
 George Evans, US congressman and senator
 John Hubbard, 22nd governor of Maine
 Dale McCormick, first openly gay member of the Maine state legislature
 Patrick K. McGowan, state legislator, candidate for governor
 Amos Nourse, doctor and US senator
 John Otis, US congressman
 James L. Reid, state representative and Maine Superior Court Justice
 Peleg Sprague, US federal judge
 Sharon Treat, state representative for Maine's 79th District
 Samuel Wells, 25th governor of Maine
 Reuel Williams, US senator

Religion 
 George B. Cheever, abolitionist minister and writer

Sports 

 Charlie Waitt, first baseman for the St. Louis Brown Stockings, Chicago White Stockings, Baltimore Orioles, and Philadelphia Quakers

References

Hallowell, Maine
Hallowell